Sigismund Freyer (22 January 1881 – 14 February 1944) was a German horse rider who competed in the 1912 Summer Olympics. He was born in Neisse. He won the bronze medal in the equestrian team jumping event.

References

External links
 profile

1881 births
1944 deaths
People from Nysa, Poland
Sportspeople from Opole Voivodeship
German male equestrians
German show jumping riders
Equestrians at the 1912 Summer Olympics
Olympic equestrians of Germany
Olympic bronze medalists for Germany
Olympic medalists in equestrian
Medalists at the 1912 Summer Olympics